Tachina actinosa is a species of fly in the genus Tachina of the family Tachinidae that is endemic to the US state of  Oregon.

References

Insects described in 1938
Diptera of North America
Endemic fauna of Oregon
actinosa